Ivan Ukhov (born September 11, 1995 in Solikamsk) is a Russian professional basketball player for CSKA Moscow of the VTB United League.

Professional career
During the 2016–17 season, Parma Basket entered the VTB United League. Despite poor results of the team in the league, as the team won only one game, Ukhov has personal success as he was named the VTB United League Young Player of the Year. 

On July 25, 2018, Ukhov signed a three-year deal with VTB champions CSKA Moscow. On June 21, 2021, Ukhov renewed his contract with CSKA for three (2+1) more seasons.

Career statistics

EuroLeague

|- 
| style="text-align:left;"|2018–19†
| style="text-align:left;" rowspan="4"|CSKA Moscow
| 13 || 0 || 5.3 || .818 || .200 || 1.000 || 0.8 || 0.6 || .2 || .0 || 1.7 || 1.8
|- 
| style="text-align:left;"|2019–20
| 6 || 0 || 5.1 || .667 || .200 || .0 || 1.2 || 0.3 || .3 || .2 || 1.2 || 0.7
|-
| style="text-align:left;"|2020–21
| 26 || 4 || 9.0 || .286 || .385 || .250 || 0.8 || 0.8 || .3 || .0 || 2.2 || 0.7
|-
| style="text-align:left;"| 2021–22
| 16 || 0 || 8.4 || .400 || .286 || .750 || 0.9 || 0.6 || .3 || .1 || 1.6 || 1.1

References

1995 births
Living people
People from Solikamsk
Sportspeople from Perm Krai
Russian men's basketball players
Parma Basket players
PBC CSKA Moscow players
Shooting guards